Edward James Roberts (1891–1972) was a New Zealand cricketer: a wicket-keeper who appeared in three first-class matches for Wellington in the 1909–10 season and he also played for the All Blacks from 1913 to 1921.

References
Edward Roberts from CricketArchive

External links

New Zealand cricketers
Wellington cricketers
1891 births
1972 deaths
New Zealand international rugby union players
Rugby union players from Wellington City